James Jeffrey "Jeff" Bradstreet (July 6, 1954 – June 19, 2015), was an American doctor, alternative medicine practitioner, and a former preacher who ran the International Child Development Resource Center in Melbourne, Florida, a medical practice in Buford, Georgia and in Arizona, where he practiced homeopathy. He also founded the Good News Doctor Foundation, which aimed to combine Christian beliefs with his medical practice.

Education and career
Bradstreet obtained a Florida medical license in 1984. He received a Bachelor of Science degree from the University of South Florida in 1976, where he also went to medical school beginning three years later. His postgraduate research focused on aerospace medicine, and he received his training in this field from Wilford Hall Medical Center. He was an adjunct professor of child development and neuroscience at the Southwest College of Naturopathic Medicine in Tempe, Arizona.

Autism claims and treatments
Bradstreet published autism research, which he claimed indicated vaccines as a cause, in the fringe partizan Journal of American Physicians and Surgeons, which is not indexed by PubMed. This research claimed that autistic children had a higher body burden of mercury, and that three autistic children had measles RNA in their cerebrospinal fluid. The Institute of Medicine has rejected any relationship between vaccines and autism.

Bradstreet treated Colten Benevento a child diagnosed with autism (one of the test cases in the autism omnibus trial) with chelation therapy on the premise of removing mercury from his body, in spite of the fact that hair, blood, and urine tests had failed to show he exhibited abnormal levels of mercury. Over an eight-year period, Colten visited Bradstreet's office 160 times. Stephen Barrett has stated, "It appears to me that Bradstreet decides which of his nonstandard theories to apply and records diagnoses that embody them," and describes Bradstreet's mercury provoked tests as "phony". Peter Hotez characterized Bradstreet's proposal to treat autism with chelation therapy as "dangerous."

In an interview with the Chicago Tribune, Bradstreet defended the use of intravenous immunoglobulin (IVIG) as an autism treatment, saying, "Every kid with autism should have a trial of IVIG if money was not an option and IVIG was abundant." Bradstreet also published research regarding the use of hyperbaric oxygen therapy for autism, some of which concluded it was ineffective, as well as a paper arguing that autistic children have an increased vulnerability to oxidative stress. Further treatments Bradstreet used on autistic children included the controversial protein GcMAF, with which he claimed to have treated 600 children. In an article for an anti-vaccine magazine, Bradstreet endorsed stem cell therapy as an autism treatment.

Personal life and death
Bradstreet was found dead from a gunshot wound to the chest in the Broad River in Rutherford County, North Carolina in June 2015, after his Buford, Georgia medical office was raided by the FDA in connection with an investigation into GcMAF treatments. At the time of his death, he lived in Braselton and ran his medical practice in Buford. While the police declared Bradstreet's death a suicide, a theory has spread holding that Bradstreet was murdered for his use of a "holistic" therapy.

Bradstreet's son has been diagnosed with autism, which Bradstreet attributed to a vaccination his son received at age 15 months.

Selected publications

References

External links 
 Questions Still Surround Autism

1954 births
2015 deaths
American anti-vaccination activists
Autism researchers
People from Buford, Georgia
People from Melbourne, Florida
Physicians from Florida
Suicides by firearm in North Carolina
University of South Florida alumni
2015 suicides